Melodies of America (Spanish:Melodías de América) is a 1941 Argentinian musical comedy film directed by Eduardo Morera and starring José Mojica, Silvana Roth and June Marlowe.  It was intended as an Argentine response to the Latin-American themed films produced by Hollywood as part of the Good Neighbor policy.

Synopsis
A group of Argentine filmmakers struggle to make a film with a panamerican theme. They eventually manage to raise the finances for the film and hires a famous Mexican singer to star in it. On the boat down he meets and falls in love with a poor woman from Buenos Aires. Meanwhile an American actress who has failed in Hollywood attempts to get a role in the production.

Cast
 José Mojica
 Silvana Roth
 June Marlowe
 José Ramirez
 Armando Bó
 Carmen Brown
 Pedro Quartucci
 María Santos
 Bola de Nieve 
 Ana María González
 Nelly Omar
 Juan Carlos Altavista
 Rafael Carret

References

Bibliography 
 Melgosa, Adrián Pérez. Cinema and Inter-American Relations: Tracking Transnational Affect. Routledge, 2012.

External links 

1941 films
Argentine musical comedy films
1941 musical comedy films
1940s Spanish-language films
Films directed by Eduardo Morera
Films set in Buenos Aires
Films set in Rio de Janeiro (city)
American black-and-white films
1940s Argentine films